The Thunderbird Invitational was a professional golf tournament on the PGA Tour, played from 1952 to 1959 in Rancho Mirage, California. 
Held in late January at Thunderbird Country Club, the tournament's purse was a modest $15,000; it was the direct predecessor of the Desert Classic, which began in 1960. Thunderbird hosted the Ryder Cup in 1955.

Arnold Palmer, 29, was the event's final champion in 1959; he won the next year at the first edition of the "Palm Springs Desert Classic," which had a $100,000 purse and a winner's share of 12,000, his largest tour check to date.

Ken Venturi, 26, won the 1958 event and was awarded a $1,500 check and a $4,500 automobile.
He backed it up with another win the following week at Phoenix.

Jimmy Demaret won the event three times; his first was a 54-hole midweek event in 1953, and the last was an 18-hole playoff on Monday in 1957 for consecutive titles.

The 1952 event was a 36 hole pro-am, played midweek. Dutch Harrison won the best-ball while Jim Ferrier and Cary Middlecoff had the best professional scores.

Winners

Playoffs
In 1953 it was over 54 holes, midweek. In 1955 Mayfield won with a birdie on second extra hole after 18-hole playoff. Mayfield and Souchak scored 69, Haas 70. In 1957 Demaret won after an 18-hole playoff, scoring 67, Souchak scored 75 and Venturi 76.

References

External links
Winners list on the PGA Tour's official site
Thunderbird Country Club – history

Former PGA Tour events
Golf in California